The I Battle Squadron was a unit of the German Imperial Navy before and during World War I. Being part of the High Seas Fleet, the squadron saw action throughout the war, including the Battle of Jutland on 31 May – 1 June 1916, where it formed the center of the German line.

Notes

References

See also
Imperial German Navy order of battle (1914)

Naval units and formations of Germany in World War I
Military units and formations of the Imperial German Navy